Peter Sykes may refer to:

 Peter Sykes (director) (1939–2006), Australian/British film director
 Peter Sykes (chemist) (1923–2003), British chemist